Thalassema steinbecki  is a species of marine echiuran worm. It is found in the northeast Pacific Ocean. This species was formally described in 1946 by the American marine biologist Walter Kenrick Fisher (1878-1953), the specific name honours the American novelist John Steinbeck (1902-1968) who led the expedition which collected the type specimens.

References

Echiurans